Kiila is the eighth studio album by Finnish rock band Apulanta. It was released on March 16, 2005, by Levy-Yhtiö. Some tracks on the album contain violins. The album is sung in Finnish. The album reached gold certification status on the day that it was released.

Track listing 
 "Syöpä" (Cancer) - 04:01
 "Pala siitä" (A Piece From It) - 03:31
 "Pahempi toistaan" (Worse Than The Other) - 05:09
 "Valon juuri" (Light's Root) - 4:13      
 "Armo" (Mercy) - 4:19        
 "Usko" (Faith) - 4:02        
 "Kuollakseen elossa" (Living to Die) - 3:50      
 "Routa" (Frost) - 4:34       
 "Laululintu" (Songbird) - 3:16      
 "Kaukaa lähelle" (From Far to Close) - 3:37

Personnel 
 Toni Wirtanen: Vocals and guitar
 Simo "Sipe" Santapukki: Drums
 Sami Lehtinen: Bass guitar
 Emppu Vuorinen (from Nightwish): Guitar on "Kaukaa lähelle"
 Anssi Tikanmäki: String arrangements

Charts 
In the twelfth week of 2005, the album debuted at number one in Finland, staying there for just one week, before dropping to number two. After 28 weeks, in the thirty-ninth week of 2005, it finally dropped out of the charts from number 31. This makes it Apulanta's most successful studio album in Finland (a singles compilation collection released in 1998 also stayed in the charts for 28 weeks).

On the day of its release the album had already been given "Gold" certification. Before the end of 2005 it had sold 50,000 copies in Finland meaning that it was "Platinum" certified as well. It is Apulanta's best selling studio album.

Singles 
Two singles were released from the album. "Pahempi toistaan" was released in the ninth week of 2005 (three weeks before the album), reached number one in the Finnish charts and stayed in the charts for 15 weeks. "Armo" was released in the thirty-ninth week of 2005 and debuted at number one, staying there for just one week as well, and staying in the charts for 10 weeks. Both singles were regularly played on Finnish radio stations.

External links 
 Last.FM page
 Track Meanings (translated from Finnish)
 Chart Information (translated from Finnish)

2005 albums
Apulanta albums